The Shetland Gas Plant is a natural-gas processing plant in the Shetland Islands, Scotland.

History
The site is the collection point for the Laggan-Tormore project, involving two large gas fields. The Laggan gas field was discovered in 1986. The Tormore gas field was discovered in 2007. The plan for the site was approved in March 2010. 

The site was formally opened by Amber Rudd on 16 May 2016.

Structure
The site is connected to the Shetland Islands Regional Gas Export Pipeline (SIRGE). The site was built by Petrofac's Offshore Engineering & Operations unit; Petrofac is a recent constituent of the FTSE 100 Index. The site and pipelines cost around £800m. The gas is exported from the site via a   diameter pipe south to the Frigg UK System in Aberdeenshire.

The site is next door, to the east, of the Sullom Voe Terminal.

Operation
Production from the site began on 8 February 2016. The production from the Laggan-Tormore project is expected to be around 93,000 barrels of oil equivalent per day.

See also
 St Fergus Gas Terminal
 West of Shetland pipeline
 2016 in Scotland

References

External links
 Offshore Technology

2016 establishments in Scotland
Buildings and structures in Shetland
Energy infrastructure completed in 2016
Natural gas infrastructure in the United Kingdom
Natural gas terminals
North Sea energy
Oil and gas industry in Shetland
Mainland, Shetland